Rory Prendergast (born 6 April 1978 in Pontefract, West Yorkshire) is an English footballer who began his career at Frickley Athletic and played in the Football League for York City, Blackpool, Rochdale and Darlington.

References

1978 births
Living people
Sportspeople from Pontefract
English footballers
Association football midfielders
Frickley Athletic F.C. players
Rochdale A.F.C. players
Barnsley F.C. players
York City F.C. players
Oldham Athletic A.F.C. players
Northwich Victoria F.C. players
Nuneaton Borough F.C. players
Bradford (Park Avenue) A.F.C. players
Accrington Stanley F.C. players
Blackpool F.C. players
Halifax Town A.F.C. players
Darlington F.C. players
Farsley Celtic A.F.C. players
Eastwood Town F.C. players
Goole A.F.C. players
Tiverton Town F.C. players
Clevedon Town F.C. players
English Football League players